Iglesia de Santiago de Mens is a church in Malpica de Bergantiños, Province of A Coruña, Galicia, Spain. It was founded in the 12th century, and built in a Romanesque style.

12th-century Roman Catholic church buildings in Spain
Churches in Galicia (Spain)
Buildings and structures in the Province of A Coruña
Bien de Interés Cultural landmarks in the Province of A Coruña